Catostylus is a genus of jellyfish in the family Catostylidae.

Species
The following species are recognized in the genus Catostylus.
Catostylus cruciatus (Lesson, 1830)
Catostylus mosaicus (Quoy & Gaimard)
Catostylus ornatellus (Vanhöffen, 1888)
Catostylus ouwensi Moestafa & McConnaughey, 1966
Catostylus perezi (Ranson, 1945)
Catostylus tagi (Haeckel, 1869)
Catostylus townsendi Mayer, 1915
Catostylus tripterus (Haeckel, 1880)
Catostylus turgescens (Schulze, 1911)
Catostylus viridescens (Chun, 1896)

References

 
Catostylidae
Scyphozoan genera